Remy White Trafelet (born March 1970) is an American businessman, hedge fund manager, and investor. He is the president and CEO of investment firm Trafelet & Company, LLC, and Chairman of Hazeltree Treasury Solutions, a company Trafelet founded in 2011. He is a founding partner and managing director of Colonnade Capital LLC and the CEO of Special-purpose acquisition company Colonnade Acquisition Corp. II. He was previously the president and CEO of Alico, Inc. He is the husband of Lady Melissa Percy, whom he married in 2019.

Career and Education
Trafelet is president and Chief Executive Officer of private investment firm Trafelet & Company, LLC, a company he originally founded as Trafelet Capital Management in 1999. Trafelet is known for his active investment strategy involving hands-on research and in-person visits to likely investment targets. He prefers a bottom-up approach to stock picking rather than top-down sector analysis.

Trafelet graduated from Phillips Exeter Academy and earned an A.B. degree from Dartmouth College. He started his career as an analyst and portfolio manager at Fidelity Management and Research Company. By the age of 25, he was managing a $500 million mutual fund. In 1998 he was hired by Bowman Capital Management, running a diversified stock portfolio that netted an annualized return of 48% over two years.

Trafelet launched Trafelet Delta Funds in November 2000, building the firm to a peak of $6 billion in assets under management in 2006. The firm recorded a 25.1% annualized return from its inception through 2007.

The 2008 financial crisis resulted in a 26% fall for Trafelet's flagship fund, which was managing assets from major banks, including Merrill Lynch, Deutsche Bank, and Citigroup. While the fund outperformed major stock indices in 2008, large institutional investors and banks were seeking liquidity and freeing up assets to meet their own financial obligations. Trafelet refused to gate redemptions and the subsequent outflow left Trafelet with approximately $3 billion in managed assets by the end of 2008.

In January 2014, Trafelet teamed up with George Brokaw, previously a managing director at Highbridge Capital Management, to form Trafelet Brokaw & Co., which he co-managed until 2018.

Trafelet founded fintech company Hazeltree in 2011. He is Chairman of the company, which provides treasury solutions to financial institutions and asset managers with over $2.5 trillion in assets under advisory.

In 2016, Trafelet was appointed president and CEO of Alico, Inc., owner of the largest citrus producer in the United States, where he had been serving as director since the purchase of a majority interest in 2013. Trafelet restructured Alico in 2017, cutting over $20 million in operating costs and reinvesting in citrus production with the replanting of over 400,000 citrus trees. In 2018, he attempted to reconstitute Alico's board, reducing the number of seats and bringing in more independent members. The action was met with resistance from existing board members and a legal battle ensued. Trafelet voluntarily resigned in February 2019 as part of an amicable settlement with Alico. He remains the largest shareholder and a consultant to the company.

In 2020, Trafelet formed special purpose acquisition company (SPAC) Colonnade Acquisition Corp. with the CEO of Colonnade Properties, Joseph Sambuco. The company filed for a $200 million IPO in August of that year. Ouster Inc, a U.S. startup that makes lidar sensors for self-driving cars and smart cities, announced that it had reached a deal to go public via merger with Colonnade Acquisition Corp. in December, 2020. Trafelet was appointed to Ouster's board of directors following the successful completion of the deal. Trafelet and Sambuco formed a second SPAC, Colonnade Acquisition Corp. II, and priced a $300 million IPO in March, 2021. The pair co-founded alternative asset management firm Colonnade Capital LLC in 2021 and Trafelet is a partner and managing director of the firm.

Trafelet is also the owner and operator of pecan producer Mercer Mill Pecans in the U.S. state of Georgia.

Philanthropy and public positions
Trafelet is on the Executive Committee and Board of the Children's Scholarship Fund and is a former Trustee and Chairman of the Investment Committee at Phillips Exeter Academy. He is also on the Board of Trustees of the Boys' Club of New York and chairs the organization's Investment Committee. He is President of the Trafelet Family Foundation and serves as a Director of the Atlantic Salmon Federation.

Personal life
Trafelet has been married twice. On 30 September 2000, he married Lara Elizabeth Schmidt at Trinity Episcopal Church in Columbus, Ohio. They had three children, Remy, Charlotte, and Franny, before divorcing in 2018.
 
Trafelet married Lady Melissa Percy on 19 December 2019 at Mercer Mill Plantation in Oakfield, Georgia. The couple had their first child together, daughter Bluebell Rose Trafelet, on 19 February 2020.

References

American investors
American hedge fund managers
American stock traders
Dartmouth College alumni
1970 births
Living people